A Little Sex is a 1982 American comedy film produced by MTM Enterprises and distributed by Universal Pictures. It was directed by Bruce Paltrow and written by Bob DeLaurentis. The film starred Tim Matheson and Kate Capshaw.

Plot
Young television producer, Michael Donovan, tries to abandon his womanizing ways when he meets and marries elementary school teacher Katherine. Among his endearments to her is filming himself in his studio, costumed as "The Sandman," sitting on a makeshift moon with a starry background, and telling stories to entertain Katherine's class. When Michael's struggles to resist the near-irresistible temptations on his job lead to Katherine catching him in the act on the set, they separate. After his wise, and composed older brother Tommy helps him see how empty womanizing really is, Michael puts "The Sandman" to work in a bid to win Katherine back.

Cast
 Tim Matheson as Michael Donovan
 Kate Capshaw as Katherine Harrison
 Edward Herrmann as Tommy Donovan
 John Glover as Walter
 Joan Copeland as Mrs. Harrison
 Susanna Dalton as Nancy Barwood
 Wendie Malick as Philomena
 Wallace Shawn as Oliver

References

External links
 
 
 
 
 

1982 films
1982 romantic comedy films
American romantic comedy films
American sex comedy films
1980s English-language films
Films scored by Georges Delerue
Films set in New York City
Films shot in New York City
MTM Enterprises films
1980s sex comedy films
1982 directorial debut films
1980s American films